Njivica is a small settlement in the Municipality of Kranj in the Upper Carniola region of Slovenia
.

References

External links

Njivica on Geopedia

Populated places in the City Municipality of Kranj